Eugène Barthe (1862–1945) was a French entomologist. While living in Vienne (Isère), he created the journal . In 1918, he moved into his father's house in Castanet-Tolosan (Haute-Garonne), where a street was later named in his honour. As well as editing the journal, he also wrote several books which act as supplements to the journal. These covered the beetle fauna of France and the Rhine Valley.

Works
 1896 – Catalogus Coleopterorum Galliae et Corsicae, 220 pages
 1909–1924 – Faune Franco-Rhénane. Carabidae, 536 pages
 1920–1936 – Faune Franco-Rhénane. Adephaga, 472 pages, 815 figures
 1922 – Faune Franco-Rhénane. Liodidae, 119 pages
 1926 – Faune Franco-Rhénane. Heteroceridae, 35 pages, 22 figures
 1926 – Faune Franco-Rhénane. Georyssidae, 12 pages, 9 figures
 1927 – Faune Franco-Rhénane. Dryopidae, 74 pages
 1928 – Faune Franco-Rhénane. Throscidae, 23 pages, 10 figures
 1928 – Faune Franco-Rhénane. Cerophytidae, Eucnemidae, 48 pages
 1931 – Faune Franco-Rhénane. Cicindelidae, 41 pages, 23 figures

References

1862 births
1945 deaths
French entomologists
Coleopterists
People from Vienne, Isère